Sir Henry Robert Conway Dobbs  (26 August 1871 – 30 May 1934) was an administrator in British India and High Commissioner in Iraq.

Career

Dobbs was educated at Winchester College and Brasenose College, Oxford. He joined the Indian Civil Service in 1892, and in 1903 he was sent to repair boundary pillars erected by the Afghan Boundary Commission along the Russo-Afghan border. After several other posts, he served as the Chief Commissioner of Balochistan 1917–1919. Dobbs was the British Representative on the Kabul Mission in January 1921, during which he met with Afghan Foreign Minister Mahmud Tarzi to discuss Anglo-Afghan relations.

The result was the Anglo-Afghan Treaty of 22 November 1921, which confirmed the Indo-Afghan border, established diplomatic ties between London and Kabul, and defined special trade agreements. He later served as High Commissioner to the Kingdom of Iraq from 1923 to 1929, the longest time this position was held by anyone during the course of the Iraq Mandate.

Honours
He was appointed a Companion of the Order of the Indian Empire (CIE) on 31 May 1905 for his services in Afghanistan, and appointed a Companion of the Order of the Star of India (CSI) on 18 August 1916 for meritorious war services. In January 1921, he was knighted as a Knight Commander of the Order of the Indian Empire (KCIE),

He was appointed a Knight Commander of the Order of the Star of India in 1923, a Knight Commander of the Order of St. Michael and St. George (KCMG) in the 1925 Birthday Honours List and a Knight Grand Cross of the Order of the British Empire (GBE) on 1 March 1929.

Publications
A monograph on the pottery and glass industries of the North-Western Provinces and Oudh, North-Western Provinces and Oudh Government Press, Allahabad, 1895.
Korah (A drama, in verse), Grant Richards, London, 1903.

Offices held

References
Notes

Bibliography
DOBBS, Sir Henry Robert Conway, Who Was Who, A & C Black, 1920–2008; online edn, Oxford University Press, Dec 2007, accessed 22 July 2012

1871 births
1934 deaths
Indian Civil Service (British India) officers
People educated at Winchester College
Alumni of Brasenose College, Oxford
Ambassadors of the United Kingdom to Iraq
Knights Grand Cross of the Order of the British Empire
Knights Commander of the Order of the Star of India
Knights Commander of the Order of St Michael and St George
Knights Commander of the Order of the Indian Empire
Fellows of the Royal Geographical Society
Indian Political Service officers